Osteochilus pentalineatus is a species of cyprinid fish endemic to southern Borneo.

References

Taxa named by Maurice Kottelat
Fish described in 1982
Osteochilus